Schlömilch's series is a Fourier series type expansion of twice continuously differentiable function in the interval  in terms of the Bessel function of the first kind, named after the German mathematician Oskar Schlömilch, who derived the series in 1857. The real-valued function  has the following expansion:

where

Examples
Some examples of Schlömilch's series are the following:
Null functions in the interval  can be expressed by Schlömilch's Series, which cannot be obtained by Fourier Series. This is particularly interesting because the null function is represented by a series expansion in which not all the coefficients are zero. These properties were identified by Niels Nielsen.

See also 
 Kapteyn series

References

Series expansions